Sphenella marginata is a species of fly in the family Tephritidae, the gall flies. It is found in the  Palearctic . The larvae feed on Senecio vulgaris.

References

Tephritinae
Insects described in 1814
Diptera of Europe